Västerbotten County held a regional council election on 14 September 2014, on the same day as the general and municipal elections.

Results
The number of seats remained at 71 with the Social Democrats winning the most at 30, a drop of two from 2010. The party received around 41.1% of an overall vote of 171,729.

Municipalities

Images

References

Elections in Västerbotten County
Västerbotten